Ethics in mathematics is an emerging field of applied ethics, the inquiry into ethical aspects of the practice and applications of mathematics. It deals with the professional responsibilities of mathematicians whose work influences decisions with major consequences, such as in law, finance, the military, and environmental science.

Although many research mathematicians see no ethical implications in their pure research, assumptions made in mathematical approaches can have real consequences. A very instrumental interpretation of the impact of mathematics makes it difficult to see ethical consequences, but it is easier to see how all branches of mathematics serve to structure and conceptualise solutions to real problems. These structures can set up perverse incentives, where targets can be met without improving services, or league table positions are gamed. While the assumptions written into metrics often reflect the world view of the groups who are responsible for designing them, they are harder for non-experts to challenge, leading to injustices.

Need for ethics in the mathematics profession
Mathematicians in industrial, scientific, military and intelligence roles crucially influence decisions with significant consequences.

Issues of accuracy
For example, complex calculations were needed for the success of the Manhattan Project, while the overextended use of the Gaussian copula formula to price derivatives before the Global Financial Crisis of 2008 has been called "the formula that killed Wall Street", and the theory of global warming depends on the reliability of mathematical models of climate.

Issues of impact
For the same reason as in medical ethics and engineering ethics, the high impact of the consequences of decisions imposes serious ethical obligations on practitioners to consider the rights and wrongs of their advice and decisions. The potential impact of data and new technology is leading more professions, such as accountancy, to consider how bias is overseen in automated systems, from algorithms to AI.

Disasters and scandals involving the use of mathematics
These illustrate the major consequences of numerical mistakes and hence the need for ethical care.
 The Club of Rome's 1972 mathematical-model based predictions in The Limits to Growth of widespread collapse of the world system by the end of the 21st century.
 Wrongful conviction of Sally Clark (1999), An English solicitor, Sally Clark, was wrongfully convicted of murdering her two children – each of whom had died due to sudden infant death syndrome – due to a fundamental statistical error in the testimony of an "expert". The error was further compounded by the "prosecutor's fallacy".

Ethical issues in the mathematical profession
Mathematicians in professional roles in finance and similar work have a particular responsibility to ensure they use the best methods and data to reach the right answer, as the prestige of mathematics is high and others rely on mathematical results which they cannot fully understand. Other ethical issues are shared with information economy professionals in general, such as duty of care, confidentiality of information, whistleblowing, and avoiding conflict of interest.

Mathematicians have a professional responsibility to support the ethical use of mathematics in practice, both to sustain the reputation of the profession and to protect society from the impacts of unethical behaviour. For example, mathematics is extensively applied in the use of Big Data in Artificial Intelligence applications, both by mathematicians and non-mathematicians, with complex impacts that are not readily understood or anticipated.

Ethics in data journalism
Journalism has an established Professional ethics which is affected by mathematical processing and (re-)publication of sources. Reusing information packaged as facts requires checking, and validating, form conceptual confusion to sampling and calculation errors. Other professional issues arise from the potential of automated tools which allow dissemination of publicly available data which has never been collated.

Misuse of statistics

Applications of mathematics generally involve drawing of conclusions from quantitative data. Due to uncertainities that mathematical models deal with, challenges in drawing and communicating any conclusions, there is a possibility of mathematicians misleading the clients as they are not generally aware of quantitative techniques. To avoid such instance, statisticians codified their ethics in the 1980s in a declaration of the ISI, recognising that there would often be conflicting demands from stakeholders, with ethical decisions a matter of professional judgement.

Mathematical folklore

Priority and attribution of mathematical discovery are important to professional practice, even as some theorems bear the name of the person making the conjecture rather than finding the proof. Folk theorems, or mathematical folklore cannot be attributed to an individual, and may not have an agreed proof, despite being an accepted result, potentially leading to injustice.

Ethics in pure mathematical research
The American Mathematical Society publishes a code of ethical guidelines for mathematical researchers. The responsibilities of researchers include being knowledgeable in the field, avoiding plagiarism, giving credit, publishing without unreasonable delay, and correcting errors. The European Mathematical Society Ethics Committee also publishes a code of practice relating to the publication, editing and refereeing of research.

It has been argued that as pure mathematical research is relatively harmless, it raises few urgent ethical issues. However, that raises the question of whether and why pure mathematics is ethically worth doing, given that it consumes the lives of many highly intelligent people who could be making more immediately useful contributions.

Parallels between ethics and mathematics
Ethics and mathematics both appear to rely on reasoning from intuition, unlike empirical sciences which rely fundamentally on observations and experiments. That has been suggested as a reason in support of objectivity or moral realism in ethics, since arguments against objectivity in ethics are paralleled by arguments against objectivity in mathematics, which is generally believed to be false.

Justin Clarke-Doane argues to the contrary that although mathematics and ethics are closely parallel, a pluralist attitude should be taken to the truths of both. Just as the parallel postulate is true in Euclidean geometry but false in non-Euclidean geometry, so ethical propositions can be true or false in different systems.

Teaching ethics in mathematics
Courses in the ethics of mathematics remain rare. The University of New South Wales taught a compulsory course on Professional Issues and Ethics in Mathematics in its mathematics degrees from 1998 to 2012.

See also 
 
 
 
 
 
 
 
 
 Ethics of quantification

Notes

References

 Aitken, C., Roberts, P. & Jackson, G., Communicating and Interpreting Statistical Evidence in the Administration of Criminal Justice, Practitioner Guide No.1: Fundamentals of Probability and Statistical Evidence in Criminal Proceedings: Guidance for Judges, Lawyers, Forensic Scientists and Expert Witnesses, Royal Statistical Society, 2010.
 Alayont, F. (2022), "A Case for Ethics in the Mathematics Major Curriculum", Journal of Humanistic Mathematics, Vol.12, No.2, (July 2022), pp.160-177.
 Balinski, M., "What is just?", American Mathematical Monthly, Vol.112, No.6, (June-July 2005), pp. 502-511.
 Boylan, M., "Ethical Dimensions of Mathematics Education", Educational Studies in Mathematics, Vol.92, No.3, (July 2016), pp. 395–409.
  Buell C, Piercey V. (2022), "Special Issue   Ethics in Mathematics: Foreword", Journal of Humanistic Mathematics, Vol.12, No.2, (July 2022), pp.3-6.
 Chiodo, Maurice, and Toby Clifton. "The importance of ethics in mathematics." European Mathematical Society Newsletter 114 (December 2019): 34-37.
 Chiodo, Maurice, and Piers Bursill-Hall. "Teaching Ethics in Mathematics." European Mathematical Society Newsletter, 114 (2019): 38-41.
 Dubbs, Christopher (2020), "Whose Ethics? Toward Clarifying Ethics in Mathematics Education Research", Journal of Philosophy of Education, Vo.54, No.3,  (June 2020), pp.521-540. 
 Dworkin, G., "A Journal of Mathematical Ethics: A Proposal", The Philosophical Forum, Vol.13, No.4, (Summer 1982), pp. 413–415.
 Ernest, P. "What is Our First Philosophy in Mathematics Education?", For the Learning of Mathematics, Vol.32, No.3, (November 2012), pp. 8–14.
 Ernest, P., "A Dialogue on the Ethics of Mathematics", The Mathematical Intelligencer, Vol.38, No.3, (September 2016), pp. 69–77.
 Ernest, P., "The Ethics of Mathematics: Is Mathematics Harmful?",  Ernest, P., (Ed.)The Philosophy of Mathematics Education Today. Switzerland: Springer, 2018, pp 187-216.
 Franklin, J., "On the Parallel Between Mathematics and Morals", Philosophy, Vol.79, No.1, (January 2004), pp. 97–119.
 Henrich, D., "Mathematical Ethics: Values, Valences and Virtue", Philosophy of Mathematics Education Journal, No.29, (July 2015).
 Kambartel, Friedrich (1972), "Ethik und Mathematik", pp.489–503 in Riedel, Manfred (ed.), Rehabilitierung Der Praktischen Philosophie, Band I: Geschichte, Probleme, Aufgaben, Freiburg im Breisgau: Rombach Verlag.
 Kambartel, Freidrich (trans. Gervasi, J.A. & Rentsch, T.) (1984), "Ethics and Mathematics", pp.49-61 in Christensen, D.E. (ed.), Contemporary German Philosophy, Volume 4, University Park, PA: Pennsylvania State University Press.
 Lesser, L.M. & Nordenhaug, E., "Ethical statistics and statistical ethics: Making an interdisciplinary module", Journal of Statistics Education, Vol.12, No.3, (November 2004), pp. 50–56.
 Levy, D.M. & Peart, S.J., "Inducing Greater Transparency: Towards the Establishment of Ethical Rules for Econometrics", Eastern Economic Journal, Volume 34, Issue 1, (January 2008), pp 103–114.
 Miller A.N. (2022). "A Mini-seminar: Teaching Ethics in Mathematics in an Hour a Week",  Journal of Humanistic Mathematics. 12(2): 178-203.
 Müller, Dennis (2022). "Situating "Ethics in Mathematics" as a Philosophy of Mathematics Ethics Education", arXiv preprint arXiv: 2202.00705.
 Müller, Dennis, Chiodo, Maurice, and Franklin, James (2022), "A Hippocratic Oath for Mathematicians? Mapping the Landscape of Ethics in Mathematics", Science and Engineering Ethics, Vol.28, No.41. 
 Nickel G. (2022), "Ethics and Mathematics  Some Observations Fifty Years Later", Journal of Humanistic Mathematics, Vol.12, No.2, (July 2022), pp.7-27.
 Shulman, B. J., "Is there enough poison gas to kill the city?: The teaching of ethics in mathematics classes", The College Mathematics Journal, Vol.33, No.2, (March 2002), pp. 128–125.
 Spindler, R. (2022), "Foundational Mathematical Beliefs and Ethics in Mathematical Practice and Education", Journal of Humanistic Mathematics, Vol.12, No.2, (July 2022), pp.49-71.
 Stinson, D.W., "In Search of Defining Ethics in (Mathematics) Education Research?", Journal of Urban Mathematics Education, Vol.10, No.1, (July 2017), pp. 1–6.
 Strasak, A. M, Zaman, Q, Pfeiffer, K. P., Göbel, G. & Ulmer, H., "Statistical errors in medical research — a review of common pitfalls", Swiss Medical Weekly, (2007), 137: 44–49.
Vardeman, S.B. & Morris, M.D., "Statistics and Ethics: Some Advice for Young Statisticians", The American Statistician, Vol.57, No.1, (February 2003), pp. 21–6.
 Young, J., "Statistical errors in medical research — a chronic disease?", Swiss Medical Weekly, (2007), 137: 41–43: editorial commentary (and elaboration) on Strasak, et al. by the Swiss Medical Weekly's Statistical Advisor.

External links
 Cambridge University Ethics in Mathematics Society
 American Mathematical Society: Policy Statement on Ethical Guidelines
 Royal Statistical Society: Statistics and the Law.

Ethics of science and technology
Philosophy of statistics
Philosophy of mathematics
Ethics and statistics
Business ethics
Professional ethics